Sally Bishop is a 1916 British silent romance film directed by George Pearson and starring Marjorie Villis, Aurelio Sidney and Peggy Hyland. It is an adaptation of the 1910 novel Sally Bishop, a Romance by E. Temple Thurston.

Cast
 Marjorie Villis - Sally Bishop
 Aurelio Sidney - John Traill
 Peggy Hyland - Janet Hallard
 Alice De Winton - Mrs Durlacher
 Jack Leigh - Arthur
 Christine Rayner - Miss Standish Rowe
 Hugh Croise - Charles Devenish
 Fred Rains - Reverend Bishop

References

External links

1916 films
1910s English-language films
Films directed by George Pearson
1910s romance films
British romance films
Films based on Irish novels
British silent feature films
British black-and-white films
1910s British films